Ogodzha is a rural locality (a selo) in Selemdzhinsky Selsoviet of Selemdzhinsky District, Amur Oblast, Russia. The population was 310 as of 2018. There are 13 streets.

Geography 
Ogodzha is located on the right bank of the Ogodzha River, 86 km southwest of Ekimchan (the district's administrative centre) by road. Koboldo is the nearest rural locality.

References 

Rural localities in Selemdzhinsky District